The Rochester Knighthawks were a lacrosse team based in Rochester, New York, that played in the National Lacrosse League (NLL). The 2017 season was the 23rd in franchise history.

Regular season

Final standings

Game log

Roster

Entry Draft
The 2016 NLL Entry Draft took place on September 26, 2016. The Knighthawks made the following selections:

See also
2017 NLL season

References

Rochester Knighthawks seasons
Rochester
Rochester Knighthawks